Dianetics (from Greek dia, meaning "through", and nous, meaning "mind") is a set of pseudoscientific ideas and practices regarding the metaphysical relationship between the mind and body created by science fiction writer L. Ron Hubbard. Dianetics is practiced by followers of Scientology and the Nation of Islam (as of 2010). 

Dianetics was originally conceived as a branch of psychiatry, which Hubbard would later despise when various psychoanalysts refused his form of psychotherapy. Though it is presented as a form of psychological treatment, Dianetics, and its core concepts including auditing and engrams, have been rejected by psychologists and other scientists from the outset and are unsupported by credible evidence.

Background
Dianetics divides the mind into three parts: the conscious "analytical mind", the subconscious "reactive mind", and the somatic mind. The goal of Dianetics is to erase the content of the "reactive mind", which practitioners believe interferes with a person's ethics, awareness, happiness, and sanity. The Dianetics procedure to achieve this erasure is called "auditing". In auditing, the Dianetic auditor asks a series of questions (or commands) which are intended to help a person locate and deal with painful past experiences.

Practitioners of Dianetics believe that "the basic principle of existence is to survive" and that the basic personality of humans is sincere, intelligent, and good. The drive for goodness and survival is distorted and inhibited by aberrations. Hubbard proposed this model, and then developed Dianetics with the claim that it could eradicate these aberrations.

When Hubbard formulated Dianetics, he described it as "a mix of Western technology and Oriental philosophy". Hubbard claimed that Dianetics could increase intelligence, eliminate unwanted emotions and alleviate a wide range of illnesses he believed to be psychosomatic. Among the conditions purportedly treated were arthritis, allergies, asthma, some coronary difficulties, eye trouble, ulcers, migraine headaches, sexual deviation (which for Hubbard included homosexuality), and even death.

Hubbard initially described Dianetics as a branch of psychology. Jon Atack writes that the original Dianetic techniques can be derived almost entirely from Sigmund Freud's lectures. Hubbard created the "Freudian Foundation of America" and offered graduate auditors certificates which included that of "Freudian Psychoanalyst". Hubbard was influenced in creating Dianetics by many psychologists such as William Sargant's work on abreaction therapy,  Carl Jung, Roy Grinker and John Spiegel's writing on hypnosis and hypnoanalysis, Nandor Fodor, Otto Rank, and others. Alfred Korzybski's general semantics was also cited by Hubbard as an influence.

Hubbard differentiated Dianetics from Scientology, saying that Dianetics was a mental therapy science and Scientology was a religion. Dianetics predates Hubbard's classification of Scientology as an "applied religious philosophy". Early in 1951, he expanded his writings to include teachings related to the soul, or "thetan".

History

According to Hubbard, when he was sedated for a dental operation in 1938, he had a near-death experience which inspired him to write the manuscript Excalibur, which was never published. This work would eventually become the basis for Dianetics, and later on also Scientology.

The first publication on Dianetics was "Dianetics: The Evolution of a Science", an article by Hubbard in Astounding Science Fiction (cover date May 1950). This was followed by the book Dianetics: The Modern Science of Mental Health published May 9, 1950. In these works Hubbard claimed that the source of all psychological pain, and therefore the cause of mental and physical health problems, was a form of memory known as "engrams". According to Hubbard, individuals could reach a state he named "Clear" in which a person was freed of these engrams. This would be done by talking with an "auditor".

While not accepted by the medical and scientific establishment, in the first two years of its publication, over 100,000 copies of the book were sold. Many enthusiasts emerged to form groups to study and practice Dianetics. The atmosphere from which Dianetics was written about in this period was one of "excited experimentation". Sociologist Roy Wallis writes that Hubbard's work was regarded as an "initial exploration" for further development. Hubbard wrote an additional six books in 1951, drawing the attention of a significant fan base.

Publication of Dianetics: The Modern Science of Mental Health brought in a flood of revenue, which Hubbard used to establish Dianetics foundations in six major American cities. Dianetics shared The New York Times best-seller list with other self-help writings, including Norman Vincent Peale's True Art of Happiness and Henry Overstreet's The Mature Mind. Scholar Hugh B. Urban attributed that the initial success of Dianetics to Hubbard's "entrepreneurial skills". Posthumously, Publishers Weekly awarded Hubbard a plaque to acknowledge Dianetics appearing on its bestseller list for one hundred weeks, consecutively.

Two of the strongest initial supporters of Dianetics in the 1950s were John W. Campbell, editor of Astounding Science Fiction and Joseph Augustus Winter, a writer and medical physician. Campbell published some of Hubbard's short stories and Winter hoped that his colleagues would likewise be attracted to Hubbard's Dianetics system.

Per Wallis, it was Dianetics' popularity as a lay psychotherapy that contributed to the Foundation's downfall. It was the craze of 1950–51, but the fad was dead by 1952.  Most people read the book, tried it out, then put it down.  The remaining practitioners had no ties to the Foundation and resisted its control.  Because there were no trained Dianetics professionals, factions formed.  The followers challenged Hubbard's movement and his authority.  Wallis suggests Hubbard learned an implicit lesson from this experience.  He would not make the same mistake when creating Scientology.
 
Hubbard left the Foundation, which shut down. Creditors began to demand settlement of its outstanding debts. Don Purcell, an oil millionaire Dianeticist from Wichita, Kansas, offered a brief respite from bankruptcy, but the Wichita Foundation's finances soon failed again in 1952 when Hubbard left for Phoenix with all his Dianetics materials to avoid the court bailiffs sent by Purcell, who had purchased from Hubbard for the copyrights to Dianetics in an effort to keep Hubbard from bankruptcy again.

In 1954, Hubbard defined Scientology as a religion focused on the spirit, differentiating it from Dianetics, and subsequently Dianetics Auditing Therapy, which he defined as a counseling based science that addressed the physical being. When Hubbard morphed Dianetics therapy into the religion of Scientology, Jesper Aagaard Petersen of Oxford University surmises that it could have been for the benefits from establishing it is a religion as much as it could have been from the result of Hubbard's "discovery of past life experiences and his exploration of the thetan." The reason being to avoid copyright infringement issues with use of the name Dianetics then held by Purcell. Purcell later donated the copyright ownership back to Hubbard as charitable debt relief.

With the temporary sale of assets resulting from the HDRF's bankruptcy, Hubbard no longer owned the rights to the name "Dianetics". Scientologists refer to the book Dianetics: The Modern Science of Mental Health as "Book One". In 1952, Hubbard published a new set of teachings as "Scientology, a religious philosophy". Scientology did not replace Dianetics but attempted to extended it to cover new areas: Where the goal of Dianetics is to rid the individual of his "reactive mind" engrams, the stated goal of Scientology is to rehabilitate the individual's spiritual nature so that adherents may reach their full potential.

In 1963 and again in May 1969, Hubbard reorganized the material in Dianetics, the auditing commands, and original Volney Mathieson invented E-meter use, naming the package "Standard Dianetics".  In a 1969 bulletin, "This bulletin combines HCOB 27 April 1969 'R-3-R Restated' with those parts of HCOB 24 June 1963 'Routine 3-R' used in the new Standard Dianetic Course and its application. This gives the complete steps of Routine 3-R Revised."

In 1978, Hubbard released New Era Dianetics (NED), a revised version supposed to produce better results in a shorter period of time. The course consists of 11 "rundowns" and requires a specifically trained auditor.

In the Church of Scientology, OTs study several levels of New Era Dianetics for OTs before reaching the highest level.

Basic concepts
In the book, Dianetics: The Modern Science of Mental Health, Hubbard describes techniques that he suggests can rid individuals of fears and psychosomatic illnesses. A basic idea in Dianetics is that the mind consists of two parts: the "analytical mind" and the "reactive mind". The "reactive mind", the mind which operates when a person is physically unconscious, acts as a record of shock, trauma, pain, and otherwise harmful memories. Experiences such as these, stored in the "reactive mind" are dubbed "engrams". Dianetics is proposed as a method to erase these engrams in the reactive mind to achieve a state of clear.

Hubbard described Dianetics as "an organized science of thought built on definite axioms: statements of natural laws on the order of those of the physical sciences". In April 1950, before the public release of Dianetics, he wrote: "To date, over two hundred patients have been treated; of those two hundred, two hundred cures have been obtained."

In Dianetics, the unconscious or reactive mind is described as a collection of "mental image pictures", which contain the recorded experience of past moments of unconsciousness, including all sensory perceptions and feelings involved, ranging from pre-natal experiences, infancy and childhood, to even the traumatic feelings associated with events from past lives and extraterrestrial cultures. The type of mental image picture created during a period of unconsciousness involves the exact recording of a painful experience. Hubbard called this phenomenon an engram, and defined it as "a complete recording of a moment of unconsciousness containing physical pain or painful emotion and all perceptions."

Hubbard proposed that painful physical or emotional traumas caused "aberrations" (deviations from rational thinking) in the mind, which produced lasting adverse physical and emotional effects, similar to conversion disorders. When the analytical (conscious) mind shut down during these moments, events and perceptions of this period were stored as engrams in the unconscious or reactive mind.  (In Hubbard's earliest publications on the subject, engrams were variously referred to as "Norns", "Impediments", and "comanomes" before "engram" was adapted from its existing usage at the suggestion of Joseph Augustus Winter, MD.) Some commentators noted Dianetics's blend of science fiction and occult orientations at the time.

Hubbard claimed that these engrams are the cause of almost all psychological and physical problems. In addition to physical pain, engrams could include words or phrases spoken in the vicinity while the patient was unconscious. For instance, Winter cites the example of a patient with a persistent headache supposedly tracing the problem to a doctor saying, "Take him now", during the patient's birth.  Hubbard similarly claimed that leukemia is traceable to "an engram containing the phrase 'It turns my blood to water.  While it is sometimes claimed that the Church of Scientology no longer stands by Hubbard's claims that Dianetics can treat physical conditions, it still publishes them: "when the knee injuries of the past are located and discharged, the arthritis ceases, no other injury takes its place and the person is finished with arthritis of the knee." "[The reactive mind] can give a man arthritis, bursitis, asthma, allergies, sinusitis, coronary trouble, high blood pressure ... And it is the only thing in the human being which can produce these effects ... Discharge the content of [the reactive mind] and the arthritis vanishes, myopia gets better, heart illness decreases, asthma disappears, stomachs function properly and the whole catalog of ills goes away and stays away."

According to scholar Regis Dericqeobourg, Dianetics was first presented as a psychotherapy that focused on recalling an individual's past experiences as a source of origination for someone's physical and mental impairments, as well as "inappropriate behavior." In the form of counseling that Hubbard called "auditing," "auditors attempt to wash away associated emotional burdens and therein are supposed to cure people from their troubles". Eventually, psychologists and psychiatrists began  to doubt the validity of Dianetics, leading Hubbard to the formation of Scientology as spirituality.

Some of the psychometric ideas in Dianetics, in particular the E-meter, can be traced to Carl Jung. Basic concepts, including conversion disorder, are derived from Sigmund Freud, whom Hubbard credited as an inspiration and source. Freud had speculated 40 years previously that traumas with similar content join together in "chains", embedded in the unconscious mind, to cause irrational responses in the individual. Such a chain would be relieved by inducing the patient to remember the earliest trauma, "with an accompanying expression of emotion."

According to Bent Corydon, Hubbard created the illusion that Dianetics was the first psychotherapy to address traumatic experiences in their own time, but others had done so before as standard procedure.

One treatment method Hubbard drew from in developing Dianetics was abreaction therapy.  Abreaction is a psychoanalytical term that means bringing to consciousness, and thus adequate expression, material that has been unconscious. "It includes not only the recollection of forgotten memories and experience, but also their reliving with appropriate emotional display and discharge of effect. This process is usually facilitated by the patient's gaining awareness of the causal relationship between the previously undischarged emotion and his symptoms."

According to Hubbard, before Dianetics psychotherapists had dealt with very light and superficial incidents (e.g., an incident that reminds the patient of a moment of loss), but with Dianetic therapy, the patient could actually erase moments of pain and unconsciousness. He emphasized: "The discovery of the engram is entirely the property of Dianetics. Methods of its erasure are also owned entirely by Dianetics".

While 1950 style Dianetics was in some respects similar to older therapies, with the development of New Era Dianetics in 1978, the similarity vanished. New Era Dianetics uses an E-Meter and a rote procedure  for running chains of related traumatic incidents.

Dianetics clarifies the understanding of psychosomatic illness in terms of predisposition, precipitation, and prolongation.

With the use of Dianetics techniques, Hubbard claimed, the reactive mind could be processed and all stored engrams could be refiled as experience. The central technique was "auditing", a two-person question-and-answer therapy designed to isolate and dissipate engrams (or "mental masses"). An auditor addresses questions to a subject, observes and records the subject's responses, and returns repeatedly to experiences or areas under discussion that appear painful until the troubling experience has been identified and confronted. Through repeated applications of this method, the reactive mind could be "cleared" of its content having outlived its usefulness in the process of evolution; a person who has completed this process would be "Clear".

The benefits of going Clear, according to Hubbard, were dramatic. A Clear would have no compulsions, repressions, psychoses or neuroses, and would enjoy a near-perfect memory as well as a rise in IQ of as much as 50 points. He also claimed that "the atheist is activated by engrams as thoroughly as the zealot". He further claimed that widespread application of Dianetics would result in "A world without insanity, without criminals and without war."

One of the key ideas of Dianetics, according to Hubbard, is the fundamental existential command to survive. According to Hugh B. Urban, this would serve as the foundation of a big part of later Scientology.

According to the Scientology journal The Auditor, the total number of "Clears" as of May 2006 stands at 50,311.

Procedure in practice

The procedure of Dianetics therapy (known as auditing) is a two-person activity. One person, the "auditor", guides the other person, the "pre-clear". The pre-Clear's job is to look at the mind and talk to the auditor. The auditor acknowledges what the pre-Clear says and controls the process so the pre-Clear may put his full attention on his work.

The auditor and pre-Clear sit down in chairs facing each other. The process then follows in eleven distinct steps:

1. The auditor assures the pre-Clear that he will be fully aware of everything that happens during the session.
2. The pre-Clear is instructed to close his eyes for the session, entering a state of "dianetic reverie", signified by "a tremble of the lashes". During the session, the preclear remains in full possession of his will and retains full recall thereafter.
3. The auditor installs a "canceller", an instruction intended to absolutely cancel any form of positive suggestion that could accidentally occur. This is done by saying "In the future, when I utter the word 'cancelled,' everything I have said to you while you are in a therapy session will be cancelled and will have no force with you. Any suggestion I may have made to you will be without force when I say the word 'cancelled.' Do you understand?"
4. The auditor then asks the pre-Clear to locate an exact record of something that happened to the pre-Clear in his past: "Locate an incident that you feel you can comfortably face."
5. The pre-Clear is invited by the auditor to "Go through the incident and say what is happening as you go along."
6a. The auditor instructs the pre-Clear to recall as much as possible of the incident, going over it several times "until the pre-Clear is cheerful about it".
6b. When the pre-Clear is cheerful about an incident, the auditor instructs the pre-Clear to locate another incident: "Let's find another incident that you feel you can comfortably face." The process outlined at steps 5 and 6a then repeats until the auditing session's time limit (usually two hours or so) is reached.
7. The pre-Clear is then instructed to "return to present time".
8. The auditor checks to make sure that the pre-Clear feels himself to be in "present time", i.e., not still recalling a past incident.
9. The auditor gives the pre-Clear the canceller word: "Very good. Cancelled."
10. The auditor tells the pre-Clear to feel alert and return to full awareness of his surroundings: "When I count from five to one and snap my fingers you will feel alert. Five, four, three, two, one." (snaps fingers)

Auditing sessions are supposedly kept confidential. A few transcripts of auditing sessions with confidential information removed have been published as demonstration examples. Some extracts can be found in J.A. Winter's book Dianetics: A Doctor's Report. Other, more comprehensive, transcripts of auditing sessions carried out by Hubbard himself can be found in volume 1 of the Research & Discovery Series (Bridge Publications, 1980). Examples of public group processing sessions can be found throughout the Congresses lecture series.

According to Hubbard, auditing enables the pre-Clear to "contact" and "release" engrams stored in the reactive mind, relieving him of the physical and mental aberrations connected with them. The pre-Clear is asked to inspect and familiarize himself with the exact details of his own experience; the auditor may not tell him anything about his case or evaluate any of the information the pre-Clear finds.

Therapeutic claims

In August 1950, amidst the success of Dianetics, Hubbard held a demonstration in Los Angeles' Shrine Auditorium where he presented a young woman called Sonya Bianca (a pseudonym) to a large audience including many reporters and photographers as "the world's first Clear".  Despite Hubbard's claim that she had "full and perfect recall of every moment of her life", Bianca proved unable to answer questions from the audience testing her memory and analytical abilities, including the question of the color of Hubbard's tie.  Hubbard explained Bianca's failure to display her promised powers of recall to the audience by saying that he had used the word "now" in calling her to the stage, and thus inadvertently froze her in "present time", which blocked her abilities. Later, in the late 1950s, Hubbard would claim that several people had reached the state of Clear by the time he presented Bianca as the world's first; these others, Hubbard said, he had successfully cleared in the late 1940s while working incognito in Hollywood posing as a swami. In 1966, Hubbard declared South African Scientologist John McMaster to be the first true Clear.

Hubbard claimed, in an interview with The New York Times in November 1950, that "he had already submitted proof of claims made in the book to a number of scientists and associations." He added that the public as well as proper organizations were entitled to such proof and that he was ready and willing to give such proof in detail. In January 1951, the Hubbard Dianetic Research Foundation of Elizabeth, New Jersey, published Dianetic Processing: A Brief Survey of Research Projects and Preliminary Results, a booklet providing the results of psychometric tests conducted on 88 people undergoing Dianetics therapy. It presents case histories and a number of X-ray plates to support claims that Dianetics had cured "aberrations" including manic depression, asthma, arthritis, colitis and "overt homosexuality", and that after Dianetic processing, test subjects experienced significantly increased scores on a standardized IQ test. The report's subjects are not identified by name, but one of them is clearly Hubbard himself ("Case 1080A, R. L.").

The authors provide no qualifications, although they are described in Hubbard's book Science of Survival (where some results of the same study were reprinted) as psychotherapists. Critics of Dianetics are skeptical of this study, both because of the bias of the source and because the researchers appear to ascribe all physical benefits to Dianetics without considering possible outside factors; in other words, the report lacks any scientific controls. J.A. Winter, M.D., originally an associate of Hubbard and an early adopter of Dianetics, had by the end of 1950 cut his ties with Hubbard and written an account of his personal experiences with Dianetics. He described Hubbard as "absolutistic and authoritarian", and criticized the Hubbard Dianetic Research Foundation for failing to undertake "precise scientific research into the functioning of the mind". He also recommended that auditing be done by experts only and that it was dangerous for laymen to audit each other. Hubbard writes: "Again, Dianetics is not being released to a profession, for no profession could encompass it."

Scientific rejection
Hubbard's original book on Dianetics attracted highly critical reviews from science and medical writers and organizations. The American Psychological Association passed a resolution in 1950 calling "attention to the fact that these claims are not supported by empirical evidence of the sort required for the establishment of scientific generalizations." Subsequently, Dianetics has achieved no acceptance as a scientific theory, and scientists cite Dianetics as an example of a pseudoscience.

Few scientific investigations into the effectiveness of Dianetics have been published. Professor John A. Lee states in his 1970 evaluation of Dianetics:

The MEDLINE database records two independent scientific studies on Dianetics, both conducted in the 1950s under the auspices of New York University. Harvey Jay Fischer tested Dianetic therapy against three claims made by proponents and found it does not effect any significant changes in intellectual functioning, mathematical ability, or the degree of personality conflicts; Jack Fox tested Hubbard's thesis regarding recall of engrams, with the assistance of the Dianetic Research Foundation, and could not substantiate it.

Commentators from a variety of backgrounds have described Dianetics as an example of pseudoscience. For example, philosophy professor Robert Carroll points to Dianetics' lack of empirical evidence:

The validity and practice of auditing have been questioned by a variety of non-Scientologist commentators. Commenting on the example cited by Winter, the science writer Martin Gardner asserts that "nothing could be clearer from the above dialogue than the fact that the dianetic explanation for the headache existed only in the mind of the therapist, and that it was with considerable difficulty that the patient was maneuvered into accepting it."

Other critics and medical experts have suggested that Dianetic auditing is a form of hypnosis. Hubbard, who had previously used hypnosis for entertainment purposes, strongly denied this connection and cautioned against hypnosis in Dianetics auditing. Professor Richard J. Ofshe, a leading expert on false memories, suggests that the feeling of well-being reported by pre-Clear at the end of an auditing session may be induced by post-hypnotic suggestion. Other researchers have identified quotations in Hubbard's work suggesting evidence that false memories were created in Dianetics, specifically in the form of birth and pre-birth memories.

According to an article by physician Martin Gumpert, "Hubbard's concept of psychosomatic disease is definitely wrong. Psychosomatic ailments are not simply caused by emotional disturbances: they are diseases in which the emotional and the organic factor are closely involved and interdependent."

Related works published by Hubbard 
 Dianetics: The Modern Science of Mental Health (1950)
 Science of Survival (1951)
 Dianetics: The Evolution of a Science (1955)
 Brain-Washing (1955, authorship disputed)

See also 
 Auditing (Scientology)
 Bibliography of Scientology
 Co-counselling
 A Doctor's Report on Dianetics
 E-meter
 Free Zone - Independent Scientologists who practice both Dianetics and Scientology

References

Further reading

 Atack, Jon: A Piece of Blue Sky, Lyle Stuart, London, 1988
 Benton, P; Ibanex, D.; Southon, G; Southon, P. Dianetic Processing: A Brief Survey of Research Projects and Preliminary Results, Hubbard Dianetic Research Foundation, 1951
 Behard, Richard: (May 6, 1991). "The Thriving Cult of Greed and Power". Time.
 Breuer J, Freud S, "Studies in Hysteria", Vol II of the Standard Edition of the Complete Psychological Works of Sigmund Freud (Hogarth Press, London, 1955).
 Carroll, Robert T: 'Dianetics', Skepdics Dictionary 
 Fischer, Harvey Jay: "Dianetic therapy: an experimental evaluation. A statistical analysis of the effect of dianetic therapy as measured by group tests of intelligence, mathematics and personality. " Abstract of Ph.D. thesis, 1953, New York University
 Fox, Jack et al.: An Experimental Investigation of Hubbard's Engram Hypothesis (Dianetics) in Psychological Newsletter, 1959, 10 131-134 
 Freeman, Lucy: "Psychologists act against Dianetics", The New York Times, 9 September 1950
 Gardner, Martin: Fads and Fallacies in the Name of Science, 1957, Chapter 22, "Dianetics"
 Hayakawa, S. I.: "From Science-Fiction to Fiction-Science", in ETC: A Review of General Semantics, Vol. VIII, No. 4. Summer, 1951 
 Lee, John A.: Sectarian Healers and Hypnotherapy, 1970, Ontario
 Miller, Russell: Bare-Faced Messiah, 1987
 Miscavige, David: Speech to the International Association of Scientologists, 8 October 1993
 O'Brien, Helen: Dianetics in Limbo. Whitmore, Philadelphia, 1966
 Streissguth, Thomas: Charismatic Cult Leaders. The Oliver Press, Inc., 1995
 van Vogt, A.E.: Dianetics and the Professions, 1953
 Williamson, Jack: Wonder's Child: my life in science fiction. Bluejay Books, New York, 1984
 Winter, J.A.: A Doctors Report on DIANETICS Theory and Therapy, 1951

External links

Scientology
Nation of Islam
Pseudoscience
1950 introductions
American inventions